Karlakunta  is a village in Rompicherla mandal, located in Guntur district of the Indian state of Andhra Pradesh.

Geography 

Karlkunta is surrounded by villages like Santhagudipadu, Rompicherla, Ramireddy palem, Buchibapannapalem and Muppala.

References 

Villages in Guntur district